Geyser is a small, unincorporated rural village in Judith Basin County, Montana, United States, southeast of Great Falls along U.S. Route 87.

History
The town's name originated from the mud springs in the area in which the town was first founded.  P. J. O’Hara, considered the father of Geyser, started a hotel here in 1887, and other businesses soon followed. Geyser was moved to its present location with the construction of the Great Northern rail line between Great Falls and Billings.

Education
Geyser High School's team name is the Wranglers. 13 students were enrolled in 2020.

Demographics
NB: For Census Bureau study purposes, the village was incorporated within a census-designated place (CDP) in or after 1980. Demographic data extracted from Census Bureau documents after that time will reflect on the entire CDP, not just the village proper.

Population
 As of the 2020 census, the population of the CDP was 78. The racial makeup of the CDP was 96.8% White, 0.2% Native American, and 2.3% from two or more races. Hispanic or Latino of any race were 0.7% of the population. 

As of the 2010 census it had a population of 87.

Geography
Geyser is in northwestern Judith Basin County in a broad valley between the Highwood Mountains to the north and the Little Belt Mountains to the south.

The community sits on a low bench between McCarthy Creek to the east and Crow Coulee to the west. The two creeks flow north to Hay Creek, a tributary of Arrow Creek, which flows northeast to the Missouri River.

References

Unincorporated communities in Judith Basin County, Montana
Census-designated places in Montana